Taihe County is a county of southwest Jiangxi province, People's Republic of China, situated on the west (left) bank of the Gan River. It is under the jurisdiction of the prefecture-level city of Ji'an,  to the north-northeast.

Its area is almost the size of that of Rhode Island.

Administrative divisions
์Nowadays, Taihe County consists of 16 towns and 6 townships. 
16 towns

6 townships

Demographics 

History 
According to recent archaeological discoveries, the history of Taihe County may date back to the western Zhou dynasty.
Readers of English who are interested in this county should read John W. Dardess, A Ming Society: T'ai-ho County, Kiangsi, in the Fourteenth to Seventeenth Centuries (Berkeley: University of California Press, 1996).  The book was preceded by a number of articles about the county, including John W Dardess, "A Ming Landscape: Settlement, Land Use, Labor, and Estheticism in T'ai-ho County, Jiangxi," Harvard Journal of Asiatic Studies 49.1 (1989): 295-364.

Education

Culture 

Its famous landmark is K'uai-ko Pavilion, which Huang Tingjian wrote about.

Famous Local Products 
One of the most famous local products of Taihe County is Gallus domesticus, called "Taihe Wuji" in Chinese.

Climate

Scenery

Notes and references

Further reading 

 Qian Hang, . 上海社会科学院出版社, 1995 (Shanghai). See profile at Google Books.

External links
  Government site - 

 
Taihe